Louis Emil Hofmeister (November 28, 1893 – June 24, 1973) was an American politician in the state of Washington. He served in the Washington House of Representatives and Washington State Senate.

References

1973 deaths
1893 births
Democratic Party Washington (state) state senators
Democratic Party members of the Washington House of Representatives
People from King County, Washington
20th-century American politicians